Huffer is a surname. Notable people with the surname include:

Charles M. Huffer (1894–1981), American astronomer and academic
Craig Huffer (born 1989), Australian middle-distance runner
Fred K. Huffer (1879–1943), American composer and conductor
Karin P. Huffer, American family therapist
Lynne Huffer (born 1960), American feminist
Sally Huffer (born 1965), American activist

See also
Hermann Hüffer (1830–1905), German historian and jurist